Vignettes is an album by bassist Ray Drummond which was recorded in 1995 and released on the Arabesque label the following year.

Reception

The AllMusic review by Scott Yanow said "On what is generally an extroverted session, the bassist's two "Ballade Poetiques" serve as a change of pace, fairly free flights for the trio that are quite introspective. ... A fine post bop session".

Track listing
All compositions by Ray Drummond except where noted
 "Susanita-Like" – 7:58
 "Ballade Poetique #2" – 4:33
 "Dance to the Lady" (John Handy) – 12:18
 "Dedication (To John Hicks)" – 6:32
 "I-95" – 10:02
 "Poor Butterfly" (Raymond Hubbell, John Golden) – 8:20
 "Eleanor Rigby" (John Lennon, Paul McCartney) – 8:41
 "Ballade Poetique #1" – 3:45

Personnel
Ray Drummond – double bass
Gary Bartz – alto saxophone, soprano saxophone
Chris Potter – tenor saxophone
Renee Rosnes – piano
Billy Hart – drums

References

Arabesque Records albums
Ray Drummond albums
1996 albums